The Eternity Playhouse is a 200-seat theatre in Darlinghurst, Sydney. The playhouse, which opened in 2013, was created from the heritage-listed Burton Street Tabernacle. Darlinghurst Theatre Company is the resident company. The name 'Eternity' references the work of Arthur Stace inscribing that word on Sydney streets.

References 

Theatres in Sydney
2013 establishments in Australia